This is a list of winners and nominees of the Primetime Emmy Award for Outstanding Actress in a Short Form Comedy or Drama Series. These awards, like the guest acting awards, are not presented at the Primetime Emmy Awards show, but, rather, at the Creative Arts Emmy Award ceremony.

Winners and nominations

2010s

2020s

Multiple nominations
2 nominations
 Kerri Kenney-Silver
 Mindy Sterling

References

Actress - Short Form Comedy or Drama Series
Awards for actresses